Peaks & Valleys is the third solo album by Scottish–Australian singer Colin Hay, released in 1992. Hay recorded each song in one take.

Track listing
All songs written by Colin Hay, except where noted.
"Into the Cornfields" – 3:56
"She Keeps Me Dreaming" (Hay, Deborah Conway) – 3:47
"Can't Take This Town" – 3:25
"Walk Amongst His Ruins" – 3:29
"Hold Onto My Hand" – 4:54
"Keep on Walking" – 2:28
"Dream On" – 5:16
"Boy Boy" – 2:16
"Conversation" – 3:13
"Melbourne Song" – 2:44
"Sometimes I Wish" – 6:26
"Go Ask an Old Man" – 2:54
"Sea Dogs" – 3:27

Personnel

Musicians
 Colin Hay – acoustic guitar, guitar, vocals, 12 string acoustic guitar
 Deborah Conway – vocals ("She Keeps Me Dreaming")

Production
Colin Hay – producer, mixing
Martin Pullan – engineer, mastering, mixing

References

Colin Hay albums
1992 albums
Ariola Records albums